Khader Memorial College of Engineering and Technology is a new generation engineering college in India, established during the year 2002 in memory of M.A. Khader, with the approval of All India Council for Technical Education (AICTE) and is affiliated with Jawaharlal Nehru Technological University, Hyderabad (JNTUH) to import high quality standards in technical education.

Location
The College is situated 100 km away from Hyderabad and 48 km from Nagarjunasagar on Devarakonda to Bengaluru Highway abutting double lane R&B road at Konda Bheemanapally (V), Devarakonda (M), Nalgonda District - 508 248, Telangana, India.

See also 
Education in India
Literacy in India
List of institutions of higher education in Telangana

References

External links

Educational institutions established in 2002
2002 establishments in Andhra Pradesh
Engineering colleges in Telangana